The 2018–19 Damehåndboldligaen (known as HTH GO Ligaen for sponsorship reasons) is the 83rd season of Damehåndboldligaen, Denmark's premier handball league. For the first time ever, the league features 14 teams.

Team information

Regular season

Standings

Results

Championship playoffs

Group 1

Group 2

Top goalscorers

Regular season

Overall

Monthly awards

All-Star Team 
The all-star team and awards were announced on 20 May 2019.

Number of teams by regions

References

External links
 Danish Handball Federaration 

Handboldligaen
Handboldligaen
Damehåndboldligaen